1,3,3-Trinitroazetidine (TNAZ) is a highly energetic heterocyclic compound that has been considered as a potential replacement for TNT because of its low melting point (101 °C) and good thermal stability (up to 240 °C). TNAZ was first synthesized by Archibald et al. in 1990. Several synthesis routes are known, and bulk production of several hundred kilogram batches has been demonstrated at Los Alamos National Laboratory.

Properties 
The compound crystallizes in an orthorhombic lattice with the space group Pbca. Thermolysis occurs starting around 240 °C - 250 °C with decomposition products that include nitrogen dioxide, nitric oxide, nitrous acid, carbon dioxide, and formaldehyde. It has a heat of decomposition of 6343 kJ/kg, and a detonation pressure of 36.4 GPa.

References 

Explosive chemicals
Azetidines